Haus (historically Hougs) is a former municipality in the old Hordaland county, Norway. The municipality existed from 1838 until its dissolution in 1964.  The  municipality encompassed the southern half of the island of Osterøy as well as the area across the Sørfjorden from the island to the east, south, and west (although the municipality was quite a bit larger when it was first created in 1838). The administrative centre was the village of Haus, where Haus Church is located.

History
The parish of Haus (historically spelled "Hougs") was established as a municipality on 1 January 1838 (see formannskapsdistrikt law).  On 1 January 1870, the northeastern half of the municipality (population: 2,062) was separated from Haus to form the new Bruvik Municipality. The split left Haus with a population of 4,229. 

During the 1960s, there were many municipal mergers across Norway due to the work of the Schei Committee. On 1 January 1964, the municipality of Haus was dissolved. The part of Haus municipality that was situated on the island of Osterøy was transferred to the new Osterøy Municipality and the remaining part of Haus (on the mainland) formed the new Arna Municipality.

Government
The municipal council  of Haus was made up of 37 representatives that were elected to four year terms.  The party breakdown of the final municipal council was as follows:

See also
List of former municipalities of Norway

References

External links
Map of Parishes in Hordaland in 1837

Osterøy
Former municipalities of Norway
1838 establishments in Norway
1964 disestablishments in Norway